Cristian La Grassa (born 1 August 1974) is an Italian bobsledder. He competed in the two man event at the 2002 Winter Olympics.

References

1974 births
Living people
Italian male bobsledders
Olympic bobsledders of Italy
Bobsledders at the 2002 Winter Olympics
Sportspeople from Palermo